The Tall City Open was a golf tournament on the LPGA Tour from 1964 to 1968. It was played in Midland, Texas at the Hogan Park Golf Club, except in 1967 when it was played at the Midland Country Club.

At the inaugural Tall City Open, Wright shot a 62 in the third and final round. It was the lowest score in LPGA Tour history at that time. Wright's 1964 Tall City Open win is also tied for the largest final round comeback in LPGA history.

Winners
Tall City Open
1968 Mickey Wright
1967 Carol Mann
1966 Kathy Whitworth

LPGA Tall City Open
1965 Marlene Hagge

Tall City Open
1964 Mickey Wright

References

Former LPGA Tour events
Golf in Texas
Sports in Midland, Texas
Women's sports in Texas